St. Matthew School, St. Matthew's School or St. Matthew School may refer to any of very many schools, among them the following:

Saint Matthew School (Cranston), in Cranston, Rhode Island, United States
Saint Matthew School (Saskatoon), in Saskatoon, Canada
Saint Matthews Episcopal Day School, in San Mateo, California
Saint Matthew's School, in  Saint Paul, Minnesota
St. Matthews Central School, Mudgee, New South Wales
St Matthew's Primary School, in Cambridge, England
St Matthew's Roman Catholic High School, in Manchester, England
St. Matthew's University, in the Cayman Islands
St. Matthew's High School, Keiskammahoek, Eastern Cape, South Africa